The 1987 LPGA Championship was held May 21–24 at Jack Nicklaus Golf Center at Kings Island in Mason, Ohio, a suburb northeast of Cincinnati. Played on the Grizzly Course, this was the 33rd edition of the LPGA Championship.

Jane Geddes won her second major championship, a stroke ahead of runner-up Betsy King.

Past champions in the field

Source:

Final leaderboard
Sunday, May 24, 1987

Source:

References

External links
Golf Observer leaderboard

Women's PGA Championship
Golf in Ohio
LPGA Championship
LPGA Championship
LPGA Championship
LPGA Championship
Women's sports in Ohio